Nemanja Mirosavljev (Serbian Cyrillic: Немања Миросављев; born May 10, 1970, in Novi Sad, SR Serbia, SFR Yugoslavia) is a Serbian sport shooter. He is currently a member of SD Novi Sad 1790.

Mirosavljev has competed at five Summer Olympics in his career, under three different flags - Independent Olympic Participants, Yugoslavia and also Serbia and Montenegro.

At the 2008 Summer Olympics in Beijing, People's Republic of China, Mirosavljev once again represented his country - Serbia. He gained his qualification by taking 5th place at the 2007 World Cup #2 Rifle, Pistol in Sydney, Australia and competed at the 50 m Rifle 3 Positions Men event in Beijing.

He also competed at the 2012 Summer Olympics.

References

External links
 Profile at Olympic Committee of Serbia Website
 Profile at SportsReference

1970 births
Serbian male sport shooters
ISSF rifle shooters
Shooters at the 1992 Summer Olympics
Shooters at the 1996 Summer Olympics
Shooters at the 2000 Summer Olympics
Shooters at the 2008 Summer Olympics
Shooters at the 2012 Summer Olympics
Olympic shooters as Independent Olympic Participants
Olympic shooters of Yugoslavia
Olympic shooters of Serbia
Sportspeople from Novi Sad
Living people
Shooters at the 2015 European Games
European Games competitors for Serbia
Mediterranean Games gold medalists for Yugoslavia
Mediterranean Games silver medalists for Serbia
Competitors at the 1991 Mediterranean Games
Competitors at the 1997 Mediterranean Games
Competitors at the 2005 Mediterranean Games
Competitors at the 2009 Mediterranean Games
Mediterranean Games medalists in shooting